Kamo Areyan is an Armenian economist and politician.

Biography 
1974–1979 - Yerevan Institute of National Economy. Economist. Awarded with the medal "Anania Shirakatsi" (2007).
1979–1980 - worked as an economist at the Institute of Economics of the National Academy of Sciences of the Armenian SSR. 
1980–1982 - served in the Soviet army. 
1982–1995 - scientific worker at the Institute of Economics of the National Academy of Sciences of the Armenian SSR.
1995–1997 - was a deputy of the parliament. Member of the Standing Committee on Defense, National Security and Internal Affairs. Nonpartisan.
1997–2001 - was the vice-mayor of Yerevan. From February to May 1998 - served as mayor of Yerevan. 
2001–2002 - Deputy Minister of Territorial Administration of Armenia. 
2002–2003 - Deputy Minister of Territorial Administration and Coordination of Industrial Infrastructures of Armenia.
Sine Jule 14 2003 and October 19, 2018  - First Vice Mayor of Yerevan.
Since July 9 and October 10, 2018 - temporarily acting as Mayor of Yerevan.

References 

Armenian economists
Armenian political people
1957 births
Living people
Politicians from Yerevan
Republican Party of Armenia politicians
Mayors of Yerevan